American country singer Miranda Lambert has won three Grammy Awards, twenty-nine Academy of Country Music Awards, six American Country Awards, eight CMT Music Awards, fourteen Country Music Association Awards, and other awards and nominations.

Academy of Country Music Awards 

The Academy of Country Music Awards, also known as the ACM Awards, were first held in 1966, honoring the industry's accomplishments during the previous year. It was the first country music awards program held by a major organization. The Academy's signature "hat" trophy was created in 1968. The awards were first televised in 1972 on ABC. In 1979, the Academy joined with Dick Clark Productions to produce the show. Dick Clark and Al Schwartz served as producers while Gene Weed served as director. Under their guidance, the show moved to NBC and finally to CBS, where it remains today. As of 2019, Lambert is the most awarded artist in the history of the ACM awards, receiving a special Milestone Award at their annual Honors ceremony to celebrate.

American Country Awards
The American Country Awards is a country music awards show, entirely voted on by fans. Created by the Fox Network, the awards honor country music artists in music, video, and touring categories.

American Music Awards
The American Music Awards (AMAs) is an annual American music awards show, created by Dick Clark in 1973 for ABC when the network's contract to present the Grammy Awards expired.

Billboard Music Awards
The Billboard Music Award is an honor given by Billboard, a publication and music popularity chart covering the music business. The Billboard Music Awards show had been held annually since 1989 in December until it went dormant in 2007. The awards returned in 2011 and is held annually in May.

CMT Music Awards

The CMT Music Awards is a fan-voted awards show for country music videos and television performances. The awards ceremony is held every year in Nashville, Tennessee, and broadcast live on CMT. Voting takes place on CMT's website, CMT.com.

Country Music Association Awards
The Country Music Association Awards, also known as the CMA Awards or CMAs, are presented to country music artists and broadcasters to recognize outstanding achievement in the county music industry.

Grammy Awards
A Grammy Award (originally called Gramophone Award), or Grammy, is an accolade by the National Academy of Recording Arts and Sciences (NARAS) of the United States to recognize outstanding achievement in the music industry. The annual presentation ceremony features performances by prominent artists, and the presentation of those awards that have a more popular interest.

MusicRow Awards
MusicRow hosts its MusicRow Chart Airplay Awards during the Annual Country Radio Seminar in Nashville recognizing the highest number of spins artists or labels receive from chart reporting stations throughout the year.

O Music Awards
The O Music Awards (commonly abbreviated as the OMAs) is an awards show presented by Viacom to honor music, technology and intersection between the two.

People's Choice Awards
The People's Choice Awards is an American awards show, recognizing the people and the work of popular culture, voted on by the general public. The show has been held annually since 1975. The People's Choice Awards is broadcast on CBS and is produced by Procter & Gamble and Survivor producer, Mark Burnett. In Canada, it is shown on Global.

Teen Choice Award
The Teen Choice Awards is an annual awards show that airs on the Fox television network. The awards honor the year's biggest achievements in music, movies, sports, television, fashion, and more, voted by teen viewers (ages 13 to 19). Winners receive a full size surfboard designed with the graphics of that year's show.

World Music Awards
The World Music Awards is an international awards show founded in 1989 under the high patronage of Albert II, Prince of Monaco and is based in Monte Carlo.

Other Awards and Nominations

References

Lambert, Miranda
Awards